The list below contains some of the most important mosques in modern-day Turkey that were commissioned by the members of Ottoman imperial family. Some of these major mosques are also known as a selatin mosque, imperial mosque, or sultanic mosque, meaning a mosque commissioned in the name of the sultan and, in theory, commemorating a military triumph. Some mosques were commissioned by or dedicated to other members of the dynastic family, especially important women such as the mothers or wives of sultans. Usually, only a sultanic mosque or a mosque commissioned by a queen mother (valide) was granted the privilege of having more than one minaret.

The table 

In the table below the first column shows the name, the second column shows the location, the third column shows the commissioner, the fourth column shows the architect and the fifth column shows the duration of construction.

Mosques on the hills of Istanbul 
Among those mosques in Istanbul some of them have been built on the traditional seven hills of the city (The numbers refer to the number of the hill.).

Sultan Ahmed Mosque
Nuruosmaniye Mosque
Bayezid II Mosque
Fatih Mosque
Yavuz Selim Mosque
Mihrimah Sultan Mosque

Notes

References

Bibliography
 
 
 

Ottoman mosques
Mosques in Turkey
Ottoman dynasty
Ottoman Empire-related lists
Turkey religion-related lists